The South Australian Railways M Class (1st) locomotives were originally built by the Avonside Engine Company for the Canterbury Provincial Railways in 1868 to 1874. They were later sent to South Australia in 1878 and were first in service on the South Australian Railways between 1880 and 1881.

History

The two earlier built locomotives (Nos. 44 & 46) were fitted out with well tanks instead of side tanks, while the other M class locomotives (Nos. 43, 45 and 47) did have side tanks.

On their journey to South Australia, the ship which was carrying the M Class (as well as other locomotives destined for the country) got wrecked off New Zealand. All the locomotives on board were eventually salvaged and the M Class entered service on the Port line and its branch lines. They also occasionally worked on the privately operated Glanville to Largs Bay railway line. Their duties included shunting on the wharves, and later on in their life they worked trains to Henley Beach, Outer Harbour, Semaphore and on mixed traffic trains on the Northern railway line. The class was extinct by 1922.

References

Broad gauge locomotives in Australia
M1
Avonside locomotives
0-4-2T locomotives